Penk  may refer to:

 River Penk
 Penk (Star Trek)
 Proenkephalin or PENK. A name of gene encoding a precursor of enkephalin and other related peptides.